NeonPunch was a South Korean girl group formed by A100 Entertainment. The lineup originally consisted of Dayeon, Terry, Baekah, May, and Iaan, and they released their debut mini-album Moonlight on June 27, 2018. Terry left the group the following January and was replaced by Dohee. NeonPunch released their second and final mini-album Watch Out January 30, 2019, and disbanded on August 11, 2020.

History

2017–2018: Formation and debut
On February 7, 2017, A100 Entertainment announced that they would be doing their first girl group project via their YouTube channel and started uploading covers of the group. There was a various number of members throughout the project that were always masked and kept their identities a secret while they did the covers. The number of members changed until only five members remained and they formed the final line-up. On October 2, A100 announced that their girl group will be named NeonPunch and introduced the members through a teaser for their pre-debut reality show. The members were Dayeon, Hajeong, Baekah, Arang, and Iaan. NeonPunch auditioned for JTBC's reality show, Mix Nine, but only Baekah passed the audition stage and made it onto the show.

On April 13, 2018, A100 announced that NeonPunch would be the new model for Beauty brand DPC. The members of the group were Baekah, Dayeon, and Iaan with new members May and Terry. The group was stated to debut at the end of May. On May 8, A100 announced that the debut was postponed to June, and the five members Baekah, Dayeon, Iaan, May and Terry were confirmed as the final members of NeonPunch.

On June 27, 2018, NeonPunch released their first single album, Moonlight, along with the eponymous lead single. On June 30, they made their official debut stage on the music program MBC's Show! Music Core. On October 4, A100 announced that Terry had taken a break for personal reasons and had not explained anything further.

2019–2020: Watch Out and disbandment
On January 16, 2019, A100 had revealed that Terry would permanently leave the group for health reasons. In her stead, new member Dohee joined the group prior to the group's January comeback. On January 30, NeonPunch released their second mini album Watch Out and its lead single "Tic Toc".

On August 11, 2020, A100 Entertainment announced that NeonPunch had disbanded, due in part to the label's financial hardships exacerbated by the ongoing COVID-19 pandemic.  Shortly after, it was announced by the label that Dayeon, Baekah, and Iaan would be debuting as a trio named XUM on August 25.  The debut was delayed to September 24, after one of their staff members had come into contact with someone who had COVID-19.

Members
 Dayeon – leader (2018–2020)
 Terry (2018–2019)
 Baekah (2018–2020)
 May (2018–2020)
 Iaan (2018–2020)
 Dohee (2019–2020)

Discography

Mini-albums

Singles

Awards and nominations

! 
|-
! scope="row"|2019
| NeonPunch
| 25th Korean Entertainment Arts Awards – Female Rookie of the Year Award
| 
| style="text-align:center;"|

References

External links

 

K-pop music groups
Musical groups from Seoul
South Korean girl groups
South Korean idol groups
South Korean pop music groups
Musical groups established in 2018
Musical groups disestablished in 2020
Music groups disestablished due to the COVID-19 pandemic
2018 establishments in South Korea
2020 disestablishments in South Korea